Wilfrid Alexander Johnson (October 15, 1885 – June 21, 1960) was a British lacrosse player who competed in the 1908 Summer Olympics. He was part of the British team which won the silver medal.

He read greats at Balliol College, Oxford, and later became an accountant in the Civil Service. During the First World War, he served in the Royal Naval Air Service.

References

External links 
 Olympic profile

1885 births
1960 deaths
Lacrosse players at the 1908 Summer Olympics
Olympic lacrosse players of Great Britain
Olympic silver medallists for Great Britain
Medalists at the 1908 Summer Olympics
Olympic medalists in lacrosse
20th-century British people